The  is a professional wrestling championship owned by the New Japan Pro-Wrestling (NJPW) promotion. The current and inaugural champion is Zack Sabre Jr..

History
New Japan Pro-Wrestling president and CEO Takami Ohbari and TV Asahi representative Hiroyoki Mihira announced the creation of the title at Declaration of Power on October 10, 2022. The championship is seen as a celebration of both the upcoming 50-year anniversary of the partnership between the two companies, as well as the continued growth of NJPW World, New Japan Pro-Wrestling's online streaming service. Ohbari also expressed encouragement for younger wrestlers on the roster to compete for the championship.

All matches contested for the championship will be held with a 15-minute time limit. Furthermore, due to its nature as a television championship, all championship matches (including all matches in the inaugural tournament) will be available for free through the NJPW World service, as well as through New Japan Pro-Wrestling's social media platforms.

The first champion was determined in a sixteen-man single-elimination tournament, which began on October 14, 2022 at Battle Autumn (Night 1) and concluded on January 4, 2023 at Wrestle Kingdom 17. In the event of a time limit draw during the tournament, the winner (and thus, person advancing) was decided by a coin toss.

The inaugural and current champion is Zack Sabre Jr., who won by defeating Ren Narita at Wrestle Kingdom 17: Night 1.

Championship tournament

Reigns

References

External links

New Japan Pro-Wrestling championships
World professional wrestling championships
Television wrestling championships